The Middle East Internet Exchange is a subsidiary of GPX Global Systems. The company was incorporated in August 2002 to develop and operate state-of-the-art, private, carrier neutral data centers in emerging commercial markets along the undersea cable systems of FLAG, SEA-ME-WE3, and SEA-ME-WE4.

See also 
 List of Internet exchange points

References
STC, Teleglobe in Pact to Set Up ME-IEX. Khalil Hanware, Arab News. 27 April 2005 
News: Hosting Facility, GPX, Internet Consortium, Installs Root Name Server in Egypt. The Hosting News - April 13, 2007
GPX Global Systems, Inc. Launches Neutral Middle East Internet eXchange “MEIX” in Cairo. 2007-07-21 albawaba.com

Companies established in 2002
Internet_exchange_points_in_Middleeast

Internet in Egypt